= Ambika Vihar =

Ambika Vihar may refer to:

- Ambika Vihar, Delhi
- Ambika Vihar, Kolkata
